Norbert Nigbur (born 8 May 1948  in  Gelsenkirchen, Germany) is a former German international football player.

The goalkeeper joined Gelsenkirchen's biggest club, FC Schalke 04, from SV Gelsenkirchen 06 in 1966, playing 456 matches in the Bundesliga for Schalke and Hertha BSC in between 1966 and 1983, being the first first-team player from Schalke joining the club from Berlin after the Bundesligaskandal in 1970–71. His biggest success on club level was the DFB-Pokal trophy with hometown side Schalke 04 in 1972. In the 1980s and after the end of his last Schalke contract, Nigbur played for teams as VfB Hüls, Rot-Weiss Essen and FC Luthenberg outside the top two German divisions.

He was capped on six occasions by West Germany, and was a member of the West German squad at the 1974 FIFA World Cup.

Career statistics
Ref.

Honours
FIFA World Cup: 1974
DFB-Pokal: 1972

External links

References

1948 births
Living people
Sportspeople from Gelsenkirchen
Association football goalkeepers
German footballers
Germany international footballers
Germany B international footballers
Germany under-21 international footballers
FC Schalke 04 players
Hertha BSC players
FIFA World Cup-winning players
1974 FIFA World Cup players
Bundesliga players
2. Bundesliga players
VfB Hüls players
Footballers from North Rhine-Westphalia
West German footballers